This page lists board and card games, wargames, miniatures games, and tabletop role-playing games published in 2003.  For video games, see 2003 in video gaming.

Games released or invented in 2003

Game awards given in 2003
International Gamers Award: Hammer of the Scots
Origins Vanguard Award 2002: Diceland
Spiel des Jahres: Alhambra
 Games: New England

Significant games-related events in 2003
Games magazine selects Magic: The Gathering for induction into its Hall of Fame.
Chris Moneymaker wins a US$2.5 million prize in the World Series of Poker.

Deaths

See also
 2003 in video gaming

Games
Games by year